A heatseeker is a type of missile guided by infrared homing.

Heatseeker may also refer to:
 "Heatseeker" (song), a song by AC/DC
"Heat Seeker" (song), a song by Dreamers (band) with Grandson
 Heatseeker (video game), a 2007 jet fighter game
 One of the Top Heatseekers, Billboard song and album charts for new and developing acts